Break It Up is Jemina Pearl's debut solo album. It was released on October 6, 2009 on Ecstatic Peace! Records.

Track listing 
All tracks by John Eatherly & Jemina Pearl except where noted.

 "Heartbeats" – 2:15
 "After Hours" – 2:49
 "Ecstatic Appeal" (Eatherly, Steve McDonald, Pearl) – 3:34
 "Band On The Run" – 3:03
 "I Hate People" (Eatherly, Pearl, Anna Waronker) – 3:19
 "Looking For Trouble" (Eatherly, McDonald, Pearl, Waronker) – 2:26
 "Retrograde" – 3:33
 "Nashville Shores" – 3:05
 "No Good" – 3:03
 "D Is For Danger" – 3:05
 "Selfish Heart" (Eatherly, Pearl, Waronker) – 2:15
 "Undesirable" (Eatherly, Pearl, Waronker) – 3:20
 "So Sick!" – 2:40

Personnel 
 John Angello – producer, engineer, mixing
 Greg Calbi – mastering
 John Eatherly – instrumentation
 Alfred Figueroa – overdubs
 James Frazee – assistant
 Thurston Moore – guitar, backing vocals, guest appearance
 James Pearl – vocals
 Jemina Pearl – vocals, art direction
 Iggy Pop – vocals, guest appearance
 Sandy Robertson – management
 Dave Sitek – percussion, loops, guest appearance
 Art Smith – drum technician
 Derek Stanton – guitar, guest appearance
 Ted Young – engineer

References 

2009 debut albums
Jemina Pearl albums
Ecstatic Peace! albums